USS Margaret (SP-524) was a yacht acquired by the U.S. Navy during World War I. She was reconfigured by the Navy at Boston, Massachusetts and served as a patrol craft throughout the war. Post-war she was transferred to the War Department.

World War I service
Margaret, a 145-foot steam yacht, was built in 1913 at Morris Heights, New York. She was acquired by the Navy in April 1917, converted to a patrol vessel, and commissioned late in the following June as USS Margaret (SP-524). She was renamed SP-524 in 1918.

Post-war disposition
In the Spring of 1919, following World War I service, she was ordered sold, but was instead transferred to the War Department in March 1920.

References

External links
 Photo gallery at Naval Historical Center
 Photo gallery at navsource.org

World War I patrol vessels of the United States
Ships built in Morris Heights, Bronx
Steam yachts
1913 ships